The Baltic House Festival Theatre is a theatre located in Alexander Park, Saint Petersburg, Russia, on Petrogradsky Island. It was founded in 1936 as the Lenin's Komsomol Theatre, and renamed Baltic House in 1991. From 1936-1939 it was located at 12 Vladimirsky Avenue, then moved to its current location in 1939.

Baltic House has been the main stage of the International Baltic House Theatre Festival since 1991; the international festival of mono-performances, since 1997; and "Meetings in Russia", and the international festival of Russian theatres from Commonwealth of Independent States and Baltic States, since 1998.

References

Theatres in Saint Petersburg
1936 establishments in Russia
Cultural heritage monuments of regional significance in Saint Petersburg